Edward Villiers, 1st Earl of Jersey (c. 165625 August 1711) was an English peer, courtier, and statesman of the Villiers family. He was created Baron Villiers and Viscount Villiers in 1691 and Earl of Jersey in 1697. A leading Tory politician opposed to the Whig Junto, he was made Southern Secretary in 1699.

He persuaded the young writer and diplomat Matthew Prior to abandon his former Whig allies and vote for the impeachment of his fellow Kit Cat Club member and patron Lord Halifax. Jersey replaced Halifax as Prior's patron.

Origins
He was the son of Sir Edward Villiers (1620–1689) of Richmond, Surrey, by his wife Frances Howard, the youngest daughter of Theophilus Howard, 2nd Earl of Suffolk, and Elizabeth Home.

His grandfather was Sir Edward Villiers (c. 1585–1626), Master of the Mint and Lord President of Munster who was half brother of George Villiers, 1st Duke of Buckingham and of Christopher Villiers, 1st Earl of Anglesey. His sister was Elizabeth Villiers, the mistress of King William III, and was later Countess of Orkney as the wife of George Hamilton, 1st Earl of Orkney.

Education
He was admitted to St John's College, Cambridge in 1671.

Career
Villiers was Knight Marshal to the royal household in succession to his father. He was Master of the Horse to Queen Mary II and was Lord Chamberlain to King William III and to Queen Anne. In 1696 he represented his country at the Congress of Ryswick. He was ambassador at The Hague and after his elevation to the peerage (1697) was ambassador in Paris. In 1699 he was made Secretary of State for the Southern Department, and on three occasions he was one of the Lords Justices of England. In 1704 he was dismissed from office by Queen Anne, after which he was involved in some of the Jacobite schemes, using his wife, who was a Roman Catholic, as a useful go-between. In 1711 the Queen was reluctantly persuaded to bring him back into the Cabinet, but he died immediately afterwards.

Marriage and children
On 17 December 1681 he married Barbara Chiffinch (1663before 13 December 1735), only daughter of William Chiffinch (1602–1688), Keeper of the Privy Closet and a confidant of King Charles II, and his wife Barbara Nunn. By her he had two sons and a daughter:
William Villiers, 2nd Earl of Jersey (c. 168213 July 1721)
Henry Villiers (died 1743)
Mary Villiers (died 17 Jan 1734/35), who married twice: 
Firstly to Thomas Thynne (died 1710) son of Henry Frederick Thynne and Dorothy Philips, to whom she bore a son: Thomas Thynne, 2nd Viscount Weymouth.
Secondly in 1711 she married George Granville, 1st Baron Lansdowne (1666–1735), without sons.

After Lord Jersey's death, his widow took her younger son Henry to France, for the express purpose of having him raised in the Roman Catholic faith, to which she strongly adhered. This caused something of a scandal, as Henry was a minor and a royal ward.

Death
He died on 25 August 1711 of apoplexy. The Queen had just, with reluctance, appointed him Lord Privy Seal.

References

Bibliography
 Field, Ophelia. The Kit-Cat Club: Friends Who Imagined a Nation. HarperCollins 2009.

1650s births
1711 deaths
Alumni of St John's College, Cambridge
Secretaries of State of the Kingdom of England
1
Ambassadors of England to France
Diplomatic peers
Edward Villiers, 01st Earl of Jersey
Ambassadors of England to the Netherlands
17th-century diplomats
Peers of England created by William III
Tory (British political party) politicians